Thelonious "Thelo" Gerard Aasgaard (born 2 May 2002) is a professional footballer who plays as a midfielder for English club Wigan Athletic. Born in Liverpool, England, he has represented Norway at under-16 and under-20 level internationally.

Career
Aasgaard joined the youth academy of Wigan Athletic in 2016, having previously been a part of the youth set-up at Liverpool. As a result of Wigan being put into administration in the 2019/20 season, and the team's subsequent relegation from the Championship, Aasgaard became part of the Wigan first-team squad for their 2020/21 League One campaign at the age of 18.

Aasgaard made his professional debut with Wigan in a 1–0 EFL League One loss at home to Peterborough United on 20 October 2020. He scored his first goal for Wigan in a 2–1 defeat against Oxford United on 21 November 2020. Aasgaard ended his first season having played 35 times in all competitions, including 13 league starts, scoring 3 goals.

In January 2021, Aasgaard signed his first professional contract with Wigan, signing until the summer of 2023.

After a solid start to the 2021/22 season, Aasgaard signed an improved four-and-a-half year contract, running until June 2026.

International career
Aasgaard was born in Liverpool, England, and is of Norwegian descent through his father, and of French descent through his mother.

He represented the Norway under-16 team three times in 2018.

In August 2021, Aasgaard was called up to the Norway under-20 team for the first time, and made his debut on the right of midfield in their 1-1 draw with Germany under-20 on 6 September 2021.

Career statistics

References

External links
 
 Wigan Athletic profile

2002 births
Living people
Footballers from Liverpool
Norwegian footballers
Norway youth international footballers
English footballers
Norwegian people of French descent
English people of Norwegian descent
English people of French descent
Association football midfielders
Wigan Athletic F.C. players
English Football League players